The 2018 Intrust Super Cup was the PNG Hunters fifth season in the Queensland Cup.

Season summary
The Hunters started with a trial against the  Brisbane Broncos in Port Moresby on February 24, 2018 where they lost 26-12. The Hunters finished the season in seventh spot missing out on the finals series. Ten PNG Hunters players from the 2018 squad were recruited by overseas clubs.

2018 squad

Squad movement

Gains

Losses

Fixtures

Pre-season
The Hunters lost to the Brisbane Broncos 26-12 in Port Moresby on February 24,2018.

Regular season

References

2018 in Papua New Guinea rugby league
2018 in rugby league by club
Papua New Guinea Hunters